Bandon West railway station was on the West Cork Railway in County Cork, Ireland.

History
The station opened on 12 June 1866. It was moved and rebuilt on 1 June 1874.

Regular passenger services were withdrawn on 1 January 1880.

References

Further reading 
 

Disused railway stations in County Cork
Railway stations opened in 1866
Railway stations closed in 1880
1866 establishments in Ireland
Railway stations in the Republic of Ireland opened in the 19th century